Neo Jessica Joshua (born 20 December 1987), better known as Nao, is an English singer-songwriter and record producer from East London. Her sound has been described as soul combined with electronic music, funk and R&B. Nao coined the term "wonky funk" to describe her style. She released her debut album, For All We Know, in 2016, her second album, Saturn, in 2018, followed by her most recent album, And Then Life Was Beautiful, released in 2021.

Background and early life
Nao was the youngest of five children in her Jamaican mother's house, but is the only child of her mother and father, who raised her “as friends” between London and Nottingham, where he lives. Her single “Another Lifetime” was dedicated to her mother. 

She studied vocal jazz at the Guildhall School of Music & Drama in London and went on to be a backing singer for artists such as Kwabs and Jarvis Cocker. For six years up to 2014 she sang in an all-girl a cappella group called The Boxettes.

Career
In October 2014 she released her first EP, So Good, it reached number 4 on the iTunes electronic chart and the title track made the BBC Radio 1 and BBC 1Xtra national playlists in the United Kingdom. This was followed by a second EP, 15 February (II MMXV), in May 2015, receiving the "Best New Music" tag from Pitchfork. Nao made her hit “Another Lifetime” for her mother. In September 2015 Nao was named as a nominee for best newcomer at the 2015 MOBO Awards. Nao was a featured vocalist and writer on Disclosure's UK number 1 album, Caracal, on the track "Superego". She was featured in the long list for the BBC Sound of... 2016 prize in November 2015, ultimately being named in third place in January 2016. Nao also featured as a co-writer on the track "Velvet / Jenny Francis (Interlude)" on Stormzy's debut album Gang Signs & Prayer.

Her debut album, For All We Know, was released on 29 July 2016, leading to a Brit Award Nomination for Best British Female Solo Artist.

In 2017, she released a buzz single, entitled "Nostalgia", as she tells fans that she was back in the studio recording material for her second album. During that time, she also appeared as a co-writer in Mura Masa's self-titled debut album on the song "Nothing Else!", featuring Jamie Lidell.

In mid-2018, she revealed that her next single was to be called "Another Lifetime" and co-written and produced by debut album affiliates Grades and Stint. It was eventually released in June 2018. She also performed live with Chic and Mura Masa on the song "Boogie All Night", which is included on Chic's 2018 comeback album It's About Time; she is a featured artist on the song alongside Mura Masa. She released her second album Saturn on 26 October 2018. Saturn respectively received nominations for Album of the Year at the Mercury Prize in 2019 and Best Urban Contemporary Album at the 62nd Grammy Awards in 2020.

On 29 July 2021, Nao revealed details of her third album, And Then Life Was Beautiful, which was released on September 24, 2021.

Personal life
On 15 January 2020, Nao announced via Instagram that she was expecting her first child. She gave birth to a girl on 11 June 2020. In 2021, Nao announced that she would not be touring for her third album because of her diagnosis of chronic fatigue syndrome.

Discography

Studio albums

Extended plays

Singles

Promotional singles

As featured artist

Guest appearances

Songwriting credits

Awards and nominations

References

1987 births
Living people
21st-century Black British women singers
Avant-garde singers
English electronic musicians
British women singer-songwriters
English women in electronic music
English people of Jamaican descent
English record producers